The arrondissement of Metz is an arrondissement of France in the Moselle department in the Grand Est region. It has 139 communes.

Composition

The communes of the arrondissement of Metz are:

Amanvillers
Amnéville
Ancerville
Ancy-Dornot
Antilly
Argancy
Arry
Ars-Laquenexy
Ars-sur-Moselle
Aube
Augny
Ay-sur-Moselle
Le Ban-Saint-Martin
Bazoncourt
Béchy
Beux
Bronvaux
Buchy
Burtoncourt
Chailly-lès-Ennery
Chanville
Charleville-sous-Bois
Charly-Oradour
Châtel-Saint-Germain
Cheminot
Chérisey
Chesny
Chieulles
Coincy
Coin-lès-Cuvry
Coin-sur-Seille
Colligny-Maizery
Corny-sur-Moselle
Courcelles-Chaussy
Courcelles-sur-Nied
Cuvry
Ennery
Les Étangs
Failly
Fèves
Féy
Fleury
Flévy
Flocourt
Foville
Glatigny
Goin
Gorze
Gravelotte
Hagondange
Hauconcourt
Hayes
Jouy-aux-Arches
Jury
Jussy
Laquenexy
Lemud
Lessy
Liéhon
Longeville-lès-Metz
Lorry-lès-Metz
Lorry-Mardigny
Louvigny
Luppy
Maizeroy
Maizières-lès-Metz
Malroy
Marange-Silvange
Marieulles
Marly
Marsilly
La Maxe
Mécleuves
Metz
Mey
Moncheux
Montigny-lès-Metz
Montois-la-Montagne
Moulins-lès-Metz
Noisseville
Norroy-le-Veneur
Nouilly
Novéant-sur-Moselle
Ogy-Montoy-Flanville
Orny
Pagny-lès-Goin
Pange
Peltre
Pierrevillers
Plappeville
Plesnois
Pommérieux
Rombas
Pontoy
Pouilly
Pournoy-la-Chétive
Pournoy-la-Grasse
Raville
Rémilly
Retonfey
Rezonville-Vionville
Roncourt
Rozérieulles
Sailly-Achâtel
Sainte-Barbe
Sainte-Marie-aux-Chênes
Sainte-Ruffine
Saint-Hubert
Saint-Julien-lès-Metz
Saint-Jure
Saint-Privat-la-Montagne
Sanry-lès-Vigy
Sanry-sur-Nied
Saulny
Scy-Chazelles
Secourt
Semécourt
Servigny-lès-Raville
Servigny-lès-Sainte-Barbe
Sillegny
Silly-en-Saulnois
Silly-sur-Nied
Solgne
Sorbey
Talange
Thimonville
Tragny
Trémery
Vantoux
Vany
Vaux
Vernéville
Verny
Vigny
Vigy
Villers-Stoncourt
Vry
Vulmont
Woippy

History

The arrondissement of Metz was created in 1800 and disbanded in 1871 (ceded to Germany). The arrondissement of Metz was restored in January 2015 by the merger of the former arrondissements of Metz-Campagne and Metz-Ville.

References

Metz
States and territories established in 2015